The boys' 7.5 km sprint biathlon competition at the 2020 Winter Youth Olympics was held on 14 January at the Les Tuffes Nordic Centre.

Results
The race was started at 10:30.

References

Boys' sprint